James Fitzgerald (28 November 1945 – 21 April 2013) was an English cricketer. He played fifteen first-class matches for Cambridge University Cricket Club between 1966 and 1968.

See also
 List of Cambridge University Cricket Club players

References

External links
 

1945 births
2013 deaths
Cambridge University cricketers
Cambridgeshire cricketers
Cricketers from Sutton Coldfield
English cricketers